Charles Sowa (17 April 1933 – 7 July 2013) was a Luxembourgian race walker and coach. He was born in Schifflange.

He competed at the 1960 Summer Olympics, the 1964 Summer Olympics, the 1968 Summer Olympics and the 1972 Summer Olympics. At the 1972 Summer Olympics in Munich he placed 10th in the men's 50 kilometres walk.

He was selected male Luxembourgish Sportsperson of the Year in 1964, 1967, 1971 and 1972.

References

1933 births
2013 deaths
People from Schifflange
Luxembourgian male racewalkers
Olympic athletes of Luxembourg
Athletes (track and field) at the 1960 Summer Olympics
Athletes (track and field) at the 1964 Summer Olympics
Athletes (track and field) at the 1968 Summer Olympics
Athletes (track and field) at the 1972 Summer Olympics